Trezelah is a hamlet north of Penzance in Cornwall, England, United Kingdom.

References

Hamlets in Cornwall